Matthew Ryan may refer to:

Arts and entertainment
 Matthew Ryan (musician) (born 1971), American musician
 Matthew Ryan (writer) (born 1978), Australian playwright, theatre director and screenwriter
 Matt Ryan (actor) (born 1981), Welsh actor
 Matt Ryan, character from the Australian TV series City Homicide

Politics
 Matthew Ryan (politician) (1810–1888), Stipendiary Magistrate on the 1st Council of the Northwest Territories
 Matthew J. Ryan (1932–2003), U.S. politician from Pennsylvania
 Matthew T. Ryan (born 1951), former mayor of Binghamton, N.Y.

Sports

Rugby league
 Matthew Ryan (rugby league) (born 1969), Australian rugby league footballer
 Mat Ryan (rugby league) (1913–1994), Australian rugby league player
 Matt Ryan (rugby league) (born 1988), Australian rugby league footballer

Other sports
 Matthew Ryan (equestrian) (born 1964), Australian equestrian
 Matthew Ryan (handballer) (born 1966), Olympic handball captain
 Matthew Ryan (Australian rules footballer) (born 1967)
 Matt Ryan (ice hockey) (born 1983), Canadian ice hockey player
 Matt Ryan (rower) (born 1984), Australian rower
 Matt Ryan (American football) (born 1985), American football player
 Mathew Ryan (born 1992), Australian soccer goalkeeper
 Matt Ryan (basketball) (born 1997), American basketball player